Charles of Tofta, Swedish: Karl Ulfson, Sparre av Tofta  (ca. 1320-30 – 1407) was a 14th-century Swedish magnate and High Constable of Sweden.

Biography
His birth year is unknown, but scholarly estimates point to 1320s or early 1330s at latest.
He was born as the son of the first marriage of knight Ulf Abjörnson of Engso, justiciar of Tiohärad (d. 1347) with Kristina Sigmundsdotter of the family of Tre Klöverblad. His and his father's Coat of Arms was a chevron ('spar'), and so this family is regarded as one of numerous medieval Scandinavian families retrospectively named Sparre. Through his paternal grandmother, Charles was a descendant of the Ulv branch of the House of Bjelbo (Folkungaätten) and numbered some ancient Swedish earls among his ancestors.

Charles was literate and studied in Paris. Charles was knighted between 1354 and 1358. He was summoned to the membership of the High Council of Sweden from 1356 at latest. He also acted as lawspeaker of Uppland from no later than 1362.

His step-mother Märta Sunadotter of Hultboda, heiress of Fogelvik, was sister of Erengisle Sunason of Hultboda, Earl of Orkney. From 1356, they supported the efforts of King Eric XII of Sweden (1356-1359( to rise to equal rulership with, or to depose, his father King Magnus IV of Sweden.

His half-sister, Ingeborg Ulfsdotter married a young nobleman named Benedict, Duke of Halland (c. 1330 – c. 1360) in the early 1350s. He was a favorite of King Magnus IV of Sweden. However, the duke was under increasing attacks and dissatisfaction from the party of high nobility. Benedict repudiated Duchess Ingeborg sometime in c. 1356. In 1360, Charles was with troops in Scania. Benedict was besieged at Rönneholm Castle (Rönneholms slott), and Charles reportedly took part in killing him personally.

Charles supported King Albert III of Mecklenburg. In Albert's reign, Charles was Lord High Constable of Sweden (Riksmarsk) of Sweden 1364–71. However, he accepted Queen Margaret's rule when she deposed Albert in 1388–89. Albert had appointed him as the castellan of Viipuri (see margrave of Viipuri) sometime in the 1380s. He continued in this responsible and very autonomous position over the change of ruler until 1399.

Personal life
He was married several times, possibly as many as five, but had fairly few surviving children.
With his first wife (wed 6 May 1352) Ingrid Eriksdotter of Boberg, daughter of Erik of Boberg (Erik Larsson), and his wife Birgitta Knutsdotter who was a daughter of knight Knut Folkason of the Algotssöner, son of Ingrid Svantepolksdotter, he had a son, Knut Karlson of Tofta, his only son who survived to adulthood. Knut also was knighted and was from 1376 justiciar of Södermanland, but predeceased his father, dying probably in 1389 and was apparently unmarried and childless.

Charles' second wife (from 1363) was Helena Israelsdotter of Finsta, who died ca. 1375. She was the daughter of Israel Birgersson of Finsta, justiciar of Uppland. Helena was sister of Charles' first cousin Philip Nielson of Salsta's wife Ramborg Israelsdotter of Finsta. There are no indications of any surviving children of either marriage.

His third wife was named Cecilia. The fourth, and the possible fifth, wife's names are unknown to us, but one of them bore a daughter, Margareta Karlsdotter of Tofta, sometime around the 1380s or early 1390s.

Charles inherited in ca. 1389 from his son who had inherited a sizable property from his maternal kin.  Also in ca. 1389, Charles inherited from his half-sister, Kristina Ulvsdotter, heiress of Fogelvik, widow of lord Peder Ribbing and of Niels of Rickeby, heiress of her sister Duchess Ingeborg of Halland and Finland, and her mother Märta Sunadotter, a daughter of Sune Jonsson, justiciar of Tiohärad, one of the first margraves of Viipuri.

Charles had only one surviving child, his daughter Margareta Karlsdotter of Tofta (c 1380s - 1429), who was married twice; first to Knut Tordsson Bonde of Penningby and secondly in 1414 to Steen Tureson, lord of Vik and Örby.  Margaret was the mother of King Charles VIII of Sweden (1408- 1470) and of Birgitta Steensdotter of Vik, heiress of Örby and Ekholmen. Her descendants included Regent Steen Sture the Old and Birgitta Gustavsdotter of Revsnes, who became grandmother of Gustav I of Sweden.

References

Other Sources
Folke Wernstedt (1957) Äldre svenska frälsesläkter (Stockholm : Riddarhusdirektionen) 

Year of birth missing
1407 deaths
People from Vyborg
Lawspeakers
14th-century Swedish nobility
15th-century Swedish nobility
14th-century Finnish people
15th-century Finnish people